Anthony "Tony" B. Sandoval (born May 19, 1954) is a former world class marathon runner, most noted for winning the 1980 U.S. Olympic Marathon trials, in the year the U.S. boycotted the Moscow Olympics. Sandoval's 2:10:19 performance in Buffalo, New York on May 24, 1980 was a US Olympic Trials record and faster than the 1980 Olympic Marathon winning time of 2:11:03.

Career
In his first attempt to make the Olympic team "Sandoval took a crack at the '76 Olympic Marathon Trial. He'd run a 2:19 debut in Phoenix the previous December. In the trial, held in Eugene, Oregon, Sandoval ran well but it was his first near-miss: fourth-place [with the top three making the team] in 2:14:58."

In the late 1970s, Sandoval worked towards becoming a medical doctor and competed in marathons on unusually light training. Following the 1976 trials, he trained by running 35 miles per week and ran "a 2:14:37 for second place at the Nike-Oregon Track Club Marathon in Eugene in 1978. After that, he ran 2:15:23 for 15th place in the Boston Marathon in 1979."

In September 1979, Sandoval finished the Nike OTC Marathon tied for first with Jeff Wells with a time of 2:10:20, with the two runners crossing the finish line hand-in-hand. "'We were running together,' says Sandoval, 'At the finish, I just put my arm out and Jeff put his arm out. No words were spoken.'"

Following the 1980 Trials "Sandoval made attempts in subsequent marathon trials. He ran 2:12:42 for sixth place in 1984 and 2:22:37 for 27th place in 1988. In the 1992 trials in Columbus, Ohio, Sandoval popped an Achilles tendon at 8 miles and was a dnf [did not finish]. 'That was the last time I ran hard,' he says."

Sandoval's lifetime best for 10,000 meters came at the Mt. Sac relays in 1984, where he ran 27:47.0 for fifth place. Sandoval was inducted into the Road Runners Club of America Hall of Fame in 1999.

Sandoval is currently a cardiologist in Los Alamos, New Mexico, USA.

Sandoval is referenced in the 2010 novel Again to Carthage by John L. Parker Jr.

Achievements

References

External links
https://archive.today/20070529173324/http://www.theharrier.com/marcbloomrunning/worldclassrunners/sandoval.php
http://digilander.libero.it/atletica3/Stagionali/WRL/1984/10000.htm

1954 births
American male long-distance runners
American cardiologists
Living people
Place of birth missing (living people)
People from Los Alamos, New Mexico